Emperor Gordian may refer to:

 Gordian I of Rome
 Gordian II of Rome
 Gordian III of Rome